Lapanga is a census town in Sambalpur district in the Indian state of Odisha.

Demographics
 India census, Lapanga had a population of 7,354. Males constitute 54% of the population and females 46%. Lapanga has an average literacy rate of 61%, higher than the national average of 59.5%: male literacy is 70%, and female literacy is 50%. In Lapanga, 16% of the population is under 6 years of age.

References

Cities and towns in Sambalpur district